There are many newspapers printed and distributed in the United States.

, the United States had 1,279 daily newspapers.

Top 10 newspapers by circulation 
The following is a list of the top 10 newspapers in the United States by average weekday paid circulation in 2019.

Longest-running newspapers 
The New Hampshire Gazette (1756)
The Newport (RI) Daily News (originally published as The Newport Mercury in 1758)
Hartford Courant (1764, the oldest continuously published newspaper in the United States)
The Register Star (Hudson, New York, 1785)
Poughkeepsie Journal (1785)
The Augusta Chronicle (1785)
Pittsburgh Post-Gazette (July 1786)
Daily Hampshire Gazette (September 1784)
The Berkshire Eagle (1789)
The Daily Mail (Catskill, NY, 1792)
The Recorder (1792)
Intelligencer Journal (1794, now LNP)
Rutland Herald (1794)
Norwich Bulletin (1796)
The Keene Sentinel (1799)
New York Post (1801)
The Post and Courier (1803)
The Bedford Gazette (1805)
Goshen Independent (published in Goshen New York 1806 – present)
The Bourbon County Citizen (1807) (established as The Western Citizen, it is the oldest in the state of Kentucky)
Press-Republican (April 12, 1811)
The Fayetteville Observer (1816)
Observer-Dispatch (1817)
Arkansas Democrat-Gazette (1819)
Woodville Republican (1824)
Kennebec Journal (1825)
Cherokee Phoenix (1828)
Ledger-Enquirer (1828, founded as Columbus Enquirer)
Star-Gazette (1828, founded as Elmira Gazette, the first newspaper of the now massive Gannett conglomerate)
The Providence Journal (1829)
The Post-Standard (1829)
The Philadelphia Inquirer (1829, founded as The Pennsylvania Inquirer)
The Stamford Advocate (1829, founded as The Stamford Intelligencer)
The Barnstable Patriot (1830)
The Boston Post (1831)
The Baltimore Sun (1837)
The Mining Journal (1841)
The Chicago Tribune (1847)
Taunton Daily Gazette (1848)
The Santa Fe New Mexican (1849, the oldest continuously published newspaper in the Southwestern and Western United States)
 Placerville Mountain Democrat  (1851)
 Ellsworth American  (1851)
 The New York Times  (1851)

United States newspapers by state and territory 
List of lists of newspapers:

 Alabama
 Alaska
 Arizona
 Arkansas
 California
 Colorado
 Connecticut
 Delaware
 Florida
 Georgia
 Hawaii
 Idaho
 Illinois
 Indiana
 Iowa
 Kansas
 Kentucky
 Louisiana
 Maine
 Maryland
 Massachusetts
 Michigan
 Minnesota
 Mississippi
 Missouri
 Montana
 Nebraska
 Nevada
 New Hampshire
 New Jersey
 New Mexico
 New York
 North Carolina
 North Dakota
 Ohio
 Oklahoma
 Oregon
 Pennsylvania
 Rhode Island
 South Carolina
 South Dakota
 Tennessee
 Texas
 Utah
 Vermont
 Virginia
 Washington
 Washington, D.C.
 West Virginia
 Wisconsin
 Wyoming

 American Samoa
 Guam
 Northern Mariana Islands
 Puerto Rico
 US Virgin Islands

Other lists of U.S. newspapers  
List of free daily newspapers in the United States
List of international newspapers originating in the United States
List of national newspapers in the United States
List of newspapers serving cities over 100,000 in the United States
List of weekly newspapers in the United States

By specialty 
List of African-American newspapers in the United States
English-language press of the Socialist Party of America
List of alternative weekly newspapers in the United States
List of business newspapers in the United States
List of family-owned newspapers in the United States
List of Jewish newspapers in the United States
List of LGBT periodicals in the United States
List of student newspapers in the United States
List of supermarket tabloids in the United States
List of underground press in the United States
Category:Asian-American press
Category:Ethnic press in the United States

By language 
 List of French-language newspapers published in the United States
 List of German-language newspapers published in the United States
 List of Spanish-language newspapers published in the United States

Defunct 
List of defunct newspapers of the United States

See also 

 Associated Press
 Lists of newspapers
 List of newspapers in the world by circulation
 List of newspapers in Canada

Notes

References 

 Alliance for Audited Media Research & Data
 Top 100 US Newspapers Listed by Circulation at ThePaperboy.com
 U.S. Newspapers Currently Received at the Library of Congress

External links 
U.S. Newspaper Directory, 1690-Present sponsored jointly by the National Endowment for the Humanities and the Library of Congress

 
United States